Category A services were a class of Canadian specialty television channel which, as defined by the Canadian Radio-television and Telecommunications Commission, must be offered by all digital cable and direct broadcast satellite providers that have the capability to do so.

Category A services were an amalgamation of the former analog pay and specialty services licensed prior to digital television (with the exception of general interest national news and sports specialty services which are designated as Category C services) and the former category 1 digital specialty channels. In a policy decision released on October 30, 2008, the CRTC decided that all Category 1 digital services as well as all analog pay and specialty channels would be renamed Category A services, effective September 1, 2011.
 
Category A services share a number of similar regulations, including that they must be offered by all television providers in Canada, and have higher Canadian content quota levels than Category B services. They were also previously protected by "genre protection" rules forbidding other specialty channels from directly competing with them, but the CRTC phased out this rule by reclassifying the majority of specialty channels as discretionary services with standardized conditions of license.

Category A specialty services

English

Former analog services
 BNN Bloomberg
 CMT
 CP24
 CPAC
 CTV Comedy Channel
 CTV Drama Channel
 CTV Life Channel
 CTV Sci-Fi Channel
 Discovery Channel
 DTour
 E!
 Food Network Canada
 HGTV Canada
 History
 MTV
 Much
 OLN
 OWN Canada
 Showcase
 Slice
 Sportsnet 360
 Teletoon
 Treehouse
 VisionTV
 W Network
 The Weather Network
 YTV

Former Category 1 digital services
 AMI-tv
 Cottage Life
 Crime + Investigation
 Documentary Channel
 History2
 MTV2
 One
 OutTV
 T+E

French

Former analog services
 Canal D
 Canal Vie
 CPAC
 Elle Fictions
 Évasion
 Historia
 Ici ARTV
 Max
 MétéoMédia
 SériesPlus
 Télétoon
 TV5
 Unis
 Vrak
 Z

Former Category 1 digital services
 addikTV
 RDS Info

Multicultural

Former analog services
 ATN Channel
 Fairchild TV
 Odyssey
 Talentvision
 TLN

Category A pay services

English

Former analog services
 Family Channel (two multiplex channels)
 Family Jr.
 Family CHRGD
 The Movie Network (four multiplex channels)
 HBO Canada (East)
 TMN2
 TMN3
 The Movie Network Encore (two multiplex channels)
 The Movie Network Encore 2

Former digital services
 Super Channel (four multiplex channels)
 Super Channel 2
 Super Channel 3
 Super Channel 4

French

Former analog services
 Super Écran (four multiplex channels)
 Super Écran 2
 Super Écran 3
 Super Écran 4

Defunct services 
 Argent
 BookTelevision
 Encore Avenue
 Fashion Television
 FYI
 G4
 IFC
 M3
 Movie Central
 Viceland
 WTSN

See also 
 List of television stations in Canada by call sign
 List of Canadian television networks (table)
 List of Canadian television channels
 List of Canadian specialty channels
 Category B services
 Category C services
 List of foreign television channels available in Canada
 List of United States stations available in Canada
 Digital television in Canada
 Multichannel television in Canada
 List of Canadian stations available in the United States
 List of television stations in North America by media market

References

External links
 CRTC list of all 21 original category 1 licensees

Canadian Radio-television and Telecommunications Commission
1